The Castle of Cardona is arguably the most important medieval fortress in Catalonia and one of the most important in Spain.  It is situated on a hill overlooking the river valley of the Cardener and the town of Cardona.

The fortress was initially constructed by Wilfred the Hairy in 886.  It is in both the Romanesque and Gothic styles, and includes the so-called Sala Dorada and Sala dels Entresols.  During the 14th century, the dukes of Cardona came from the most important family of the Crown of Aragon, which was second only to the royal house.  Because of this, they were called “kings without crowns,” as they had extensive territories in Catalonia, Aragon, and Valencia, and dynastic ties with Castile, Portugal, Sicily, and Naples.  This presumably increased the importance of the castle.

In 1714, even after a Bourbon siege destroyed a good part of the castle's walls, the garrison was one of the last to surrender to the Bourbon troops which supported Philip V.

Today, the castle's main jewel is the torre de la minyona (from the 11th century) a tower which measures 15 metres in height and 10 metres in diameter.  Additionally, there is the romanesque Church of Sant Vicenç de Cardona adjacent to the fort.  The fort is currently still owned by living members of the Aragón family.

See also 
Catalonia
Spain

Notes 
The movie, Chimes at Midnight, by Orson Welles was filmed at the castle in Cardona.

The portico of the Church of St. Vincenç in Cardona was once covered with murals.  Fragments of these "painted vaults" were restored in 1960 and are now displayed at the Museu Nacional d'Art de Catalunya in Barcelona.

External links
Parador at Cardona
Town council of Cardona (in Catalan)
Museu Nacional d'Art de Catalunya MNAC (National Art Museum of Catalonia)

References 
Pedrosa, Andreu (2001). The Castle of Cardona. Sant Vincenç de Castellet: Farell. 

Paradores
Castles in Catalonia
9th-century establishments in Spain
Buildings and structures completed in 886